Angola was a prosperous community of up to 750 maroons (escaped slaves) that existed in Florida from 1812 until Florida became a U.S. territory in 1821, at which point it was destroyed. The location was along the Manatee River in Bradenton, Florida, near Manatee Mineral Springs Park. The exact location is expansive, ranging from where the Braden River meets the Manatee River down to Sarasota Bay; archaeological research focuses on the Manatee Mineral Spring—a source of fresh water and later the location of the Village of Manatee two decades after the destruction of the maroon community. Archaeological evidence has been found and the archaeology report by Uzi Baram is on file with the Florida Division of Historical Resources of the Florida Department of State.

Background
Spanish Florida was a haven for escaped slaves and for Native Americans deprived of their traditional lands during colonial  times and in the first decades of U.S. independence. The Underground Railroad ran south during this period.

Three autonomous black communities developed in Spanish Florida, though not simultaneously. Fort Mose was the first and smallest autonomous black community but it was abandoned in 1763 after the Spanish cessation of Florida in the aftermath of the Seven Years' War. Fort Mose was heavily influenced by neighboring St. Augustine. The second community was at Prospect Bluff on the Apalachicola River, but it was destroyed by forces under the command of General Andrew Jackson in 1816. Angola, farthest from the border of Georgia, was the last of the black settlements to survive. According to historian Canter Brown, Jr., "Most maroon settlements were tiny because people needed to escape detection. Angola's 600 to 750 people was an incredible size back then, and shows that these were capable people." He described it as "one of the most significant historical sites in Florida and perhaps the U.S."

None of these were settled as a group, as white colonies were; refugees gradually accumulated over many years until a community of several hundred existed. Some refugees from the Negro Fort calamity came to Angola. In 1815, British officials transported around 80 black veterans of the War of 1812 to Angola.

Destruction
When Andrew Jackson became Florida's de facto territorial governor in 1821, he decided that Angola would need to be destroyed and it's runaway slave populace returned to bondage. Without the official backing of the U.S. government, Jackson decided to employ Indian allies to raid in Florida instead. "Acting in direct defiance of Secretary of War John C. Calhoun, Jackson's first order of business was to send his Creek allies on a search and destroy mission against Angola", which was "burned to the ground". The result of the raid was "terror" all over Florida and all the blacks who could left for the Bahamas. Those trying to reach the Bahamas would go to Cape Florida. They would be denied refuge in he Bahamas or assistance in general by British officials there. However they still established a settlement on Andros Island, named Red Bays in 1821.

A small number joined the Red Sticks Indians and formed a community called Minatti at the headwaters of the Peace River.

Commemoration
In July 2018, the first Back to Angola Festival was held at the Manatee Mineral Springs Park. Descendants of those who had escaped to the Bahamas attended.

See also
 Black Seminoles
 Fort Mose Historic State Park
 Negro Fort
 Prospect Bluff Historic Sites
 Seminole Wars

References

Further reading

External links
 Tragedy and Survival: Virtual Landscapes of 19th Century Maroon Landscapes

Pre-statehood history of Florida
African-American history of Florida
Angolan-American history
Manatee County, Florida
Bradenton, Florida
Black Seminoles
Spanish Florida
Seminole Wars
Populated places on the Underground Railroad
Populated places disestablished in 1821
Maroon settlements
Muscogee
Ghost towns in Florida
Seminole
African-American historic places
1821 disestablishments in Florida Territory
Populated places established in 1812
Negro Fort
Fugitive American slaves
Andrew Jackson
History of racism in Florida
Angolan expatriates in the United States